A Different Shore is the sixth studio album by Nightnoise. The album was released by Windham Hill Records on 9 May 1995.

Track listing

Musicians

 Mícheál Ó Domhnaill – vocals, guitar, whistle, synthesizer
 Tríona Ní Dhomhnaill – vocals, piano, accordion, whistle, synthesizer
 Brian Dunning – flute, alto flute, base flute, whistle, accordion, vocals
 Johnny Cunningham – fiddle, vocals

Production

 DanDan FitzGerald – engineer, mixing
 Bernie Grundman – mastering
 Kevan Scott – Mixing Assistante
 Candace Upman – art direction
 Sandy Del Rio – graphic design
 Jonathan Williams – photography (cover)
 Recorded at White Horse Studios, Portland, Oregon

Track information and credits adapted from the album's liner notes.

References 

1995 albums
Nightnoise albums